Glencoe District High School is a Thames Valley District School Board Secondary School located in the town of Glencoe, Ontario, in the county of Middlesex, in Ontario, Canada. The school is 40 minutes west of London.

Partnerships

Glencoe District High School has a Dual Credit Program affiliated with Fanshawe College and Lambton College.

See also
List of high schools in Ontario
Thames Valley District School Board

References

Educational institutions established in 1961
High schools in Middlesex County, Ontario
1952 establishments in Ontario